Valleys in Kyrgyzstan include:

A
 Alay Valley
 Arpa Valley

C
 Chüy Valley

F
 Fergana Valley

K
 Kichi-Kemin Valley
 Kyzylunkur Valley

M
 Ming-Kush Valley

S
 Suusamyr Valley

Kyrgyzstan
Valleys